Ashlu Creek is a short and swift river-like creek in British Columbia.  It is a tributary of the Squamish River and enters it about 24.3 km northwest of Squamish.

Course 

Ashlu Creek, often called the "Ashlu River" (due to its size) or "the Ashlu", begins at the outlet of an unnamed lake east of Mount Crerar.  From there all the way to its mouth, it flows southeast.  Starting at Ashlu Falls is 3.9 km long Ashlu Canyon has several big rapids and large drops making it one of the best kayaking locations in the area.  It ends about 2.1 km above the river's mouth.

Hydroelectricity 
A 49 megawatt run-of-river hydro installation below the canyon went online December 2009. A diversion weir 5 km above the power house feeds water down a bored tunnel to the site. It is owned by Innergex Renewable Energy and is expected to produce 265,000 MWh annually.

Tributaries 

Ashlu Creek's only major tributary is Tatlow Creek, which flows northeast from remote Tatlow Lake and joins the Ashlu about 15.8 km below its source. It does have several much smaller tributaries though:

Shortcut Creek
Snafu Creek
Endell Creek
Red Mountain Creek
Pykett Creek
Coin Creek
Stuyvesedt Creek
Roaring Creek
Pokosha Creek
Rob Creek
Cassetta Creek
Mowitch Creek
Sigurd Creek

See also

List of British Columbia rivers

References 

Sea-to-Sky Corridor
Rivers of the Pacific Ranges
Canyons and gorges of British Columbia
New Westminster Land District